Corbin is a surname. Notable people with the surname include:

Academics
 Alain Corbin (born 1936), French historian, specialist of the 19th century in France
 Alice Corbin Henderson (1881–1949), American poet, author and poetry editor
 Brenda Corbin (born 1942), American astronomy librarian
 John Corbin (1870–1959), American dramatic critic and author

Arts, media and entertainment
 Barry Corbin (born 1940), American character actor
 Doc Corbin Dart (born 1953), the lead singer, founder and lyricist of punk rock act The Crucifucks
 Easton Corbin, American singer
 Jane Corbin (born 1954), British journalist working for the BBC
 Levin Corbin Handy (1855–1932), American photographer
 Patrick Corbin, American dancer and founder of CorbinDances
 Virginia Lee Corbin (1910–1942), American silent film actress

Politics and law
 Arthur Linton Corbin, (1874–1967), American law professor and scholar of contract law
 Bob Corbin (1922–2013), American politician
 Charles Corbin, French diplomat
 Donald L. Corbin (1938–2016), American judge
 Eugène Corbin (1800–1874), French procureur-général (government attorney) and politician
 Eymard Corbin (born 1934), Canadian Senator
 George Corbin Washington (1789–1854), United States Congressman
 Henry Corbin (1903–1978), French philosopher, theologian, and professor of Islamic Studies at the Sorbonne in Paris
 Kilmer B. Corbin (1919–1993), American attorney
 Marie-Thérèse Lucidor Corbin (1749–1834), French Creole activist
 Michael Corbin (1955–2008), American diplomat and Ambassador to the United Arab Emirates
 Robert Corbin (contemporary), Guyanese politician
 Rosemary Corbin, former mayor of Richmond, California and community leader

Military
 Joseph Louis Corbin (1797–1859), French general
 Margaret Corbin (1751–1800), a woman who fought in the American Revolutionary War
 Henry C. Corbin (1842–1909), United States Army general
 Thomas G. Corbin (born 1820-?), United States Navy officer

Others
 Abel Corbin, (1808–1881), American financier and the husband of Virginia Grant
 Alfred Corbin (1916–1943), French resistance fighter
 Arthur Corbin Gould (1850–1903), member of the Massachusetts Rifle Association
 Austin Corbin (1827–1896), American railroad executive
 Erard Corbin de Mangoux (contemporary), French prefect and the current head of the Directorate-General for External Security, France's foreign intelligence service
 Laetitia Corbin (1657–1706), American colonist
 Myrtle Corbin (1868–1928), American dipygus
 Paula Corbin Jones (born 1966), former Arkansas state employee who sued U.S. President Bill Clinton for sexual harassment
 Rita Corbin (contemporary), American Catholic Worker and artist

Sports
 Archie Corbin (born 1967), American former Major League Baseball pitcher
 Harold Corbin (1906–1988), American Olympic fencer
 Linsey Corbin (born 1981), American triathlete
 Pa Corbin (1864-1943), American football player
 Patrick Corbin, Major League Baseball pitcher
 Philip Corbin (born 1957), chess FIDE Master from Barbados
 Ray Corbin (born 1949), American former Major League Baseball pitcher
 Roberto Corbin (born 1953), Panamanian football player known for being the first Panamanian player to play in Europe
 Serge Corbin, professional canoe racer
 Tim Corbin (contemporary), American baseball coach
 Tony Corbin (born 1974), American football player
 Tyrone Corbin (born 1962), American retired American basketball player

Fictional characters
 Mike Corbin, a character in General Hospital
 Baron Corbin, ring name of wrestler Tom Pestock

See also
Corbyn

English-language surnames
French-language surnames